Edward Caird  (23 March 1835 – 1 November 1908) was a Scottish philosopher. He was a holder of LLD, DCL, and DLitt.

Life

The younger brother of the theologian John Caird, he was the son of engineer John Caird, the proprietor of Caird & Company, born at Greenock in Renfrewshire, and educated at Greenock Academy and the Universities of Glasgow and Oxford (B.A. 1863). He was a Fellow and Tutor of Merton College from 1864 to 1866.

In 1866, he was appointed to the Chair of Moral Philosophy at Glasgow, which he held until 1893. In that year he became Master of Balliol College, from which he retired in 1907. In 1894 he was made an Honorary Fellow of Merton College.

He was elected an Honorary Fellow of the Royal Society of Edinburgh in 1900.

In May 1902 he was at Carnavon to receive the honorary degree D.Litt. (Doctor of Letters) from the University of Wales during the ceremony to install the Prince of Wales (later King George V) as Chancellor of that university.

He was a founder member of the Glasgow and West of Scotland Association for Women's Suffrage, alongside his wife, Caroline.

The philosopher John Watson was among his pupils at the University of Glasgow.

He died in Oxford on 1 November 1908 and was buried there in St Sepulchres Cemetery.

Caird was a Hegelian idealist and was an important contributor to the British idealist movement.

Family
He married Caroline Frances Wylie in 1867. They had no children.

Works
An extensive bibliography of works by and about Edward Caird has been produced by Prof. Colin Tyler (Centre for Idealism and the New Liberalism at the University of Hull, UK). It can be downloaded at: https://idealismandnewliberalism.org/bibliographies/

Books
 The Collected Works of Edward Caird, 12 volumes, ed. Colin Tyler, Bristol: Thoemmes Press, 1999
 A Critical Account of the Philosophy of Kant, with an Historical Introduction, Glasgow: J. Maclehose, 1877
 Hegel, Philadelphia: J. B. Lippincott and Co.; Edinburgh: W. Blackwood and Sons, 1883
 The Social Philosophy and Religion of Comte, Glasgow: J. Maclehose and Sons, 1885; New York: Macmillan, 1885
 The Critical Philosophy of Immanuel Kant, Glasgow: J. Maclehose and Sons, 1889; New York: Macmillan, 1889 (2 volumes) Volume 1 Volume 2 second edition 1909
 Essays on Literature and Philosophy, Glasgow: J. Maclehose and Sons, 1892 (2 volumes) Volume 1 Volume 2
 The Evolution of Religion, Glasgow: James Maclehose and Sons, 1893; New York: Macmillan, 1893 (Gifford Lectures 1890–92; I, II) 
 The Evolution of Theology in the Greek Philosophers, Glasgow: J. Maclehose and Sons, 1904 (Gifford Lectures, 1900–02; I, II)
 Lay sermons and addresses, delivered in the Hall of Balliol College, Oxford (1907)

Pamphlets
 The Problem of Philosophy at the Present Time: an Introductory Address Delivered to the Philosophical Society of the University of Edinburgh, Glasgow, James Maclehose & Sons, 1881
 The Moral Aspect of the Economical Problem: Presidential Address to the Ethical Society, London, Swan Sonnenschein, Lowrey & Co., 1888
 Address on Plato's Republic as the Earliest Educational Treatise, Bangor: Jarvis & Foster, 1894
 Individualism and Socialism, Being the Inaugural Address to the Civic Society of Glasgow (1897)
 Idealism and the Theory of Knowledge, London: Henry Frowde, 1903

References

Citations

Sources 

 Jones, H., & Muirhead, J. H., The Life and Philosophy of Edward Caird, Glasgow: MacLehose, Jackson & Co., 1921.
 Tyler, C., Edward Caird, in Dictionary of Liberal Thought; Brack & Randall (eds.), Politico's 2007, pp. 54–56.

External links 

 
The life and philosophy of Edward Caird, by Sir Henry Jones and John Henry Muirhead (1921), on the Internet Archive
Edward Caird biographical notes and Lectures online at the Gifford Lectures website
Edward Caird's grave in St Sepulchre's Cemetery, Oxford, with biography

1835 births
1908 deaths
Alumni of the University of Glasgow
Alumni of Balliol College, Oxford
Academics of the University of Glasgow
Idealists
Masters of Balliol College, Oxford
Fellows of Merton College, Oxford
Fellows of the Royal Society of Edinburgh
Fellows of the British Academy
People from Greenock
People educated at Greenock Academy
Scottish philosophers
Scottish suffragists
Presidents of Co-operative Congress
Burials at St Sepulchre's Cemetery